Víctor Bertomeu de la Hoz (born 19 October 1992) is a Spanish professional footballer who currently plays as a forward for Hong Kong Premier League club Eastern.

Club career
On 20 September 2021, Bertomeu joined Eastern.

References

External links
Playmaker Stats Profile

1992 births
Living people
Spanish footballers
Spanish expatriate footballers
Expatriate footballers in Hong Kong
Association football forwards
Eastern Sports Club footballers
Hong Kong Premier League players
FC Ascó players